The 2005 European Mountain Running Championships were held in Heiligenblut am Großglockner, Austria,

Results

Men

Women

External links

European Mountain Running Championships
European Mountain Running Championships
2005 in Austrian sport
International athletics competitions hosted by Austria